Muscle Car Chronicles is a collaboration studio album by American rapper Curren$y and Sean O'Connell. It is produced by Sean O'Connell and contains features of Mikey Rocks of The Cool Kids and Tabi Bonney. A movie for this album has been produced. It was going to be released along with the album. It is Curren$y's final album released through DD172; he is now signed to Warner Bros. The album was released on February 14, 2012. The iTunes edition of the album features 10 bonus country rock songs performed by Sean O'Connell.

Track listing
All tracks were produced by Sean O'Connell.

References

2012 albums
Currensy albums